Scoot Pte Ltd, operating as Scoot, is a Singaporean low-cost airline and a wholly owned subsidiary of Singapore Airlines. It began its operations on 4 June 2012 on medium and long-haul routes from Singapore, predominantly to various airports throughout the Asia-Pacific region. Scoot's airline slogan is Escape the Ordinary.

Initially, Scoot's fleet consisted of Boeing 777-200ER aircraft that were obtained from its parent company, Singapore Airlines. In 2015, the airline began to transition its long-haul fleet to the Boeing 787 Dreamliners. Scoot uses the Airbus A320 and the Airbus A320neo family for its short-haul flights.

On 25 July 2017, Tigerair, another low-cost Singaporean airline, officially merged with Scoot, and its operations were absorbed into Scoot with the use of its air operator's certificate (AOC) to consolidate the low-cost airline business. With the change of AOC, the airline's IATA code was changed from TZ to TR, and its ICAO code was changed from SCO to TGW, previously used by Tigerair. However, the Scoot brand and the Scooter callsign were retained. Its head office is at Changi Airport.

History

2011–2013: Inception

On 25 May 2011, Singapore Airlines announced it would establish a low-cost subsidiary airline for medium and long-haul routes. On 18 July 2011, Singapore Airlines announced Campbell Wilson as the founding CEO of the new airline. On 1 November 2011, the airline was named "Scoot". On 4 June 2012, Scoot flew its first flight from Singapore to Sydney Airport in Australia. On 12 June 2012, Scoot started flying to Gold Coast, its second Australian destination. On 24 October 2012, Scoot announced that its parent company Singapore Airlines would be transferring the 20 Boeing 787-9 Dreamliners they had ordered to Scoot to replace the current fleet of Boeing 777-200 aircraft and help with its ongoing expansion and future growth. Scoot began to consider having a mixed fleet of different variants of the Boeing 787 instead of having an all Boeing 787-9 fleet. On 26 October 2012, Scoot announced that passengers could now purchase "Interline" tickets with Tigerair.

On 31 January 2013, Scoot announced it would increase its fleet by taking delivery of a fifth Boeing 777-200 by the end of May or early June, to add two or three more routes to the network. The airline also introduced ScooTV, an in-flight entertainment streaming service for passengers, and iPads for rent. On 21 March 2013, Scoot announced that it would launch a thrice-weekly connecting flight between Singapore, Taipei and Seoul.

The route was the first low-cost flight between Singapore and Seoul, and as part of the launch campaign, Scoot allowed customers to determine the launch fares through a social media campaign. The next day, Scoot announced that the 20 Boeing 787 Dreamliners they have on order would be 10 Boeing 787-8 and 10 Boeing 787-9. On 12 June 2013, Scoot started its Singapore-Taipei-Seoul flight. On 15 November 2013, Scoot commenced its five-weekly flights from Singapore to Hong Kong, which would increase to daily services in December 2013. Later that December, Scoot commenced its five-weekly flights from Singapore to Perth.

2014–2015: Expansion

In September 2014, Scoot announced that it would introduce the B787-9 in Sydney, Perth and Hong Kong from 29 March 2015. Bangkok and Gold Coast followed in late April, destinations Tianjin Binhai International Airport, Shenyang and Qingdao came in May. On 9 December 2014, Scoot announced it would launch services from Singapore to Melbourne on 1 November 2015, using Boeing 787 aircraft. On 16 December 2014, Scoot announced its new long haul carrier in Thailand, NokScoot, a joint venture between Scoot and Nok Air. The new airline began commercial flights from Bangkok's Don Mueang airport in the second half of 2014. Nok Air owns 51% of NokScoot while Scoot takes the remaining 49%.

On 2 February 2015, Scoot took delivery of the first of 10 Boeing 787-9 Dreamliners. The aircraft entered service on 5 February 2015 and was deployed on the Singapore-Perth route. It was then operated on the Singapore-Hong Kong route the next day. As Scoot continues to take deliveries of the Boeing 787, the airline has phased out all six of its aging Boeing 777 aircraft acquired from Singapore Airlines. Scoot would then begin to transition to an all Boeing 787 fleet. On completion of the transition, Scoot would operate a total of 20 Boeing 787 Dreamliners.

In July 2015, parent company Singapore Airlines announced that Scoot suffered an operating loss of S$20 million during the first quarter of the 2015 financial year and achieved a load factor of 81.4%. On 15 October 2015, Singapore Airlines announced that Scoot would replace its existing Singapore to Jeddah service via Dubai and launch direct services between Singapore and Jeddah. The new flights commenced on 1 May 2016 after regulatory approvals. In April 2016, Scoot announced its intention to start flights to three Indian cities: Amritsar, Chennai, and Jaipur, subject to regulatory approvals. Scoot's parent company, Singapore Airlines, would serve the maximum number of 15 cities allowed after the commencement of Scoot's services to the country.

On 16 May 2016, Scoot joined the world's largest low-cost carrier alliance, Value Alliance. On 18 May 2016, Singapore Airlines established Budget Aviation Holdings, a holding company to own and manage its budget airlines Scoot and Tiger Airways following the delisting of Tiger Airways from the Singapore stock exchange.

2016–2019: Merger with Tigerair 
On 4 November 2016, Singapore Airlines announced that Tigerair would merge into Scoot. The rebranding did not affect the existing joint-ventures Tigerair Australia or Tigerair Taiwan. Tigerair Taiwan is co-owned by China Airlines, which holds 80%, and its subsidiary Mandarin Airlines holding the remaining 20%.

On 25 July 2017, Tigerair was officially merged into Scoot, using Tigerair AOC, but retaining the 'Scoot' brand. With the change of AOC, the IATA code was changed from TZ to TR. Scoot announced that it would launch flights to five more destinations: Harbin, Kuantan, Kuching, Palembang and Honolulu. On 1 December 2017, Scoot announced that it will launch flights to Berlin in 2018.

2020: COVID-19 outbreak response 
Due to COVID-19 travel restrictions, Scoot only flew to two cities in April and May 2020: Hong Kong and Perth. On 20 May 2020, Scoot announced it would expand flight operations in June 2020 to six cities: Guangzhou, Hong Kong, Ipoh, Kuching, Penang and Perth.

In June 2020, Scoot announced both of their routes to Europe were cancelled, with Athens and Berlin not to resume until at least summer 2021. In July 2020, Scoot announced that they would resume flights to Kuala Lumpur on 1 August 2020 with enhanced health and safety measures.

On 24 August 2020, Scoot announced that one of its Airbus A320 aircraft underwent cabin modifications to carry cargo in the cabin. This temporary arrangement will double its cargo capacity compared to other Airbus A320 using only bellyhold space.

2021-present: Post COVID-19 and new CEO 

On 12 November 2021 Scoot announced that London Gatwick would be added to the European network, with thrice-weekly flights from 16 December 2021 until the end of the month. The service then resumed on a seasonal basis on 22 March 2022 twice weekly, and then thrice-weekly on the 27 March 2022 onwards.

On 15 May 2022, Singapore Airlines announced Leslie Thng as the CEO of the airline, replacing the outgoing Campbell Wilson, with his last day being the 16 June 2022.

Corporate affairs

Headquarters
The airline's head office is located at Changi Airport Terminal 3. It operates out of Terminal 1, having moved there on 22 October 2019.

Corporate design
The aircraft are painted in a yellow-white livery. On 11 January 2012, Scoot unveiled its cabin crew uniform with a black and yellow theme, designed by ESTA. Following the merger with Tigerair, a new cabin crew uniform with thicker fabric was unveiled.

NokScoot

NokScoot was a Bangkok-based low-cost long-haul airline which was founded in 2015 and was a joint venture of Thailand's Nok Air and Scoot with the latter holding a 49% stake. The airline operated out of Bangkok's Don Mueang International Airport. NokScoot entered liquidation on 26 June 2020 due to the COVID-19 pandemic.

Alliance

On 16 May 2016, Scoot joined Value Alliance, the world's largest low-cost carrier alliance. The new alliance was started alongside Philippines' Cebu Pacific, South Korea's Jeju Air, Thailand's Nok Air and NokScoot, Tigerair Singapore, Tigerair Australia and Japan's Vanilla Air.

Destinations

From Singapore, Scoot flies to over 16 countries and 56 destinations across Asia, Europe and Oceania.

Codeshare agreements
Scoot codeshares with the following airlines:
 Singapore Airlines

Fleet

Current fleet
, Scoot operates the following aircraft:

Former fleet

Fleet development
The Scoot fleet began with Boeing 777-200ER aircraft acquired from its parent airline, Singapore Airlines, reconfigured with a new seating layout and modified (de-rated) engines. The airline had planned to operate a fleet of 14 aircraft by 2016. On 24 October 2012, Scoot announced that parent company Singapore Airlines would be transferring the 20 Boeing 787-9 Dreamliners it had on order to Scoot to replace Scoot's current fleet of Boeing 777-200s.

Scoot retired all six of its Boeing 777-200ERs by August 2016 and moved to an 'all-Boeing 787' fleet, following the delivery of the first of ten Boeing 787-9s on 2 February 2015 and the first of ten Boeing 787-8s in mid-2015.

On 25 July 2017, Tigerair was officially merged into Scoot, therefore, all of Tigerair's fleet were transferred to Scoot.

In October 2018, Singapore Airlines converted two of its Boeing 787-10s on order to the Boeing 787-8s, and allocated them to Scoot.

In July 2019, Scoot announced that it was ordering 16 Airbus A321neos. The first one entered service in June 2021.

As of 14 December 2022, Scoot is reportedly in talks with Embraer regarding a potential purchase of E-Jet family aircraft.

Cabin

Airbus A320
Scoot's Airbus A320 aircraft offers a single-class economy seating of 180 seats. Seats at the front of the cabin and at the emergency exit rows are known as Stretch seats and have a seat pitch of at least .

Boeing 787
Scoot's Boeing 787 aircraft are operated in a two-class configuration, ScootPlus and Economy. The 787-8s that are equipped with a crew rest area for long haul flights have three fewer seats in ScootPlus and three fewer seats in Economy than a regular 787-8. Unlike other airlines' 787s, Scoot's 787s do not feature full-size lie-flat business class seats or in-flight entertainment screens. They do feature an in-flight entertainment system, but it is only accessible through the plane's Wi-Fi network.

Wi-Fi connectivity and in-seat power supplies are available on all of Scoot's Boeing 787 aircraft.

ScootPlus
There are 21 and 35 ScootPlus seats on the Boeing 787-8 and 787-9 aircraft respectively. The full leather seats are black in colour and are arranged in a 2-3-2 configuration, with fully adjustable headrests and legrests.

Economy
There are 314 and 340 Economy seats on the Boeing 787-8 and 787-9 respectively, arranged in a 3-3-3 configuration. The Standard Economy seats, in plain dark blue, have an 18-inch seat width, and a 31-inch seat pitch. The Super Seats are only available on 787-9 aircraft. They have the same seat width as standard seats at 18-inch, but with 34 to 36-inch seat pitch. The S-T-R-E-T-C-H seats, which are bulkhead and exit row seats in the economy cabin, are also dark blue. Although they have the same 34 to 36-inch seat pitch as Super Seats, because these are bulkhead and exit row seats, there are no seats in front of them, giving them the most legroom space in the economy cabin. Only Super Seats and S-T-R-E-T-C-H Seats comes with a headrest.

Passengers can pick their seats for a fee. Passengers can book the Super Seats for a fee and can pick their seats without any additional cost. Passengers choosing S-T-R-E-T-C-H seats have to pay more compared to the Super Seats.

Scoot-In-Silence
Scoot in Silence is a small cabin with a few rows of seats right behind the ScootPlus cabin. It is advertised to be a quiet zone. Tickets are only sold to travelers aged 12 and above. On the 787-9, all seats in Scoot-In-Silence cabin are either Super Seats or S-T-R-E-T-C-H Seats. On the 787-8, only standard seats and S-T-R-E-T-C-H Seats are offered in this cabin. Seats in this zone cost slightly more than the seats in the main cabin.

See also
List of airlines of Singapore

References

External links

 Scoot official website

Airlines of Singapore
Low-cost carriers
Singapore Airlines
Airlines established in 2011
Government-owned airlines
Singaporean brands
Value Alliance
Singaporean companies established in 2011
Transport operators of Singapore